Alex Henteloff (born May 23, 1942) is an American actor.

Born in Los Angeles, California, Henteloff has appeared mostly on television in guest-starring roles. He portrayed the attorney Arnold Drake Ripner in a recurring role (in a total of 7 episodes) on the television series Barney Miller. He appeared as Doug Porterfield in 14 episodes of The Betty White Show (1977-78). His many TV appearances include I Spy, Mannix, Streets of San Francisco (3 episodes), Baretta, Family Ties, The Mary Tyler Moore Show, McCloud, Cannon, Ironside, M*A*S*H, Pistols 'n' Petticoats, Charlie's Angels, Dynasty (2 episodes), Murder, She Wrote, Soap, Quincy, M.E.,  Night Court (4 episodes), ALF, Melrose Place, Simon & Simon (4 episodes), Hill Street Blues, St. Elsewhere, Columbo and The Young Rebels (in which he co-starred in its 15-episode run, in 1970). Henteloff appeared in the first season of Barnaby Jones in the episode titled, "A Little Glory, A Little Death" (04/29/1973), and in 4 other episodes of that show. 

He was a regular on the 1973 situation comedy Needles and Pins playing Myron Russo. He also appeared in some feature film roles including Slither (1973), Hardly Working (1980), Star Trek IV: The Voyage Home (1986), and Payback (1999).

Filmography

References

External links
 
 

American male film actors
American male television actors
People from Greater Los Angeles
1942 births
Living people
Male actors from Los Angeles
20th-century American male actors